Clavis may refer to:
 Glossary, an alphabetical list of terms in a particular domain of knowledge with the definitions for those terms
 Handcuffs, restraint devices designed to secure an individual's wrists in proximity to each other after being arrested or taken into custody
Clavis (publisher), Flemish publishing house of children's literature
Clavis aurea, a Latin phrase meaning "golden key"
Clavis Salomonis (English: Key of Solomon), a pseudepigraphical grimoire attributed to King Solomon
O Clavis David, a Magnificat antiphon for December 20
Clavis Patrum Graecorum, a series of volumes which aims to contain a list of all the Fathers of the Church who wrote in Greek from the 1st to the 8th centuries
Clavis, azerbaijani beatmaker, sound producer, arranger, songwriter and rapper

See also
Clavicula (disambiguation)
Key (disambiguation)